The Santiago Municipal Literature Award is one of the oldest and most important literary awards in Chile Created in 1934 by the municipality of Santiago, its first edition awarded the categories of novel, poetry and theater (later to be renamed as dramaturgy). Two categories were added soon after – essay, in 1941, and short story, in 1954 – and four other more recently, in 2013 – children's and young adult literature, referential (memoirs, chronicles, diaries, letters, biographies, and also compilations and anthologies), journalistic research and editing. In 2014 it was decided to start awarding children's and young adult literature separately, making it a total of ten categories.

The prizes for the winners of each category consist of a sum of money – CLP$2,000,000  in 2016 – and a diploma. The works published in first edition the year prior to the contest may be submitted (in dramaturgy, the works released the year before the contest may also be submitted); in each genre, a jury selects three finalists from which it subsequently chooses the winner.

This award has undergone some interruptions during its history – It was not granted during the first three years of the dictatorship, and restored in 1976 under the administration of Mayor . In 1985, Mayor Carlos Bombal revoked the jury's decision to award Jaime Miranda's Regreso sin causa and ordered the suspension of the contest, being finally restored in 1988 by Mayor .

List of winners

1934–1939

1940–1949

1950–1959

1960–1969

1970–1979

1980–1989

1990–1999

2000–2009

2010–present

See also
 National Prize for Literature (Chile)

References

1934 establishments in Chile
Awards established in 1934
Chilean literary awards
Culture in Santiago, Chile